Garden Island Creek is a small community south west of Hobart, in the Huon Valley in Tasmania.  The area was originally settled during the 19th century primarily due to the large supply of good timber readily available; and the local geography which enabled vessels to go up the creek during high tide to collect the wood. The area currently has a number of permanent residents along with those that visit for weekends and holidays.

Garden Island Creek Post Office opened around 1875 and closed in 1969.

There was a local cricket team in the early part of the 20th century although no team currently exists.    There is a small beach at Garden Island Creek which has a direct view of Garden Island (a short distance across the water) which strangely enough has the appearance of a fish when photographed from the air.  There is a public phone box close to the creek and next to the Channel Highway (B68).

There is a garden nursery in the community and within a short drive a number of vineyards and fruit farms.

During the mid-1970s, Garden Island Creek was home to an ashram housing around fifty followers of the Divine Light Mission. The community disbanded after most of the members converted to Christianity.

References

Huon Valley
Localities of Huon Valley Council
Localities of Kingborough Council
Towns in Tasmania